The Cane Hill Road Bridge (also Little Red River Bridge) was a closed-spandrel arch bridge built in 1923 located near Prairie Grove, Arkansas. It carried Arkansas Highway 170 over the Little Red River, and was in 2014 in the process of being bypassed. AR 170 was the major north–south route in the area when the bridge was built, but this section has since been bypassed by the construction of United States Route 62. The bridge was built by the Luten Bridge Company of Knoxville, Tennessee.

The bridge was listed on the National Register of Historic Places in 2010. The bridge was replaced by a box culvert.

See also
National Register of Historic Places listings in Washington County, Arkansas
List of bridges on the National Register of Historic Places in Arkansas

References

Road bridges on the National Register of Historic Places in Arkansas
Transportation in Washington County, Arkansas
National Register of Historic Places in Washington County, Arkansas
Concrete bridges in the United States
Arch bridges in the United States
Luten bridges
1923 establishments in Arkansas
Bridges completed in 1923
Little Red River (Arkansas)